Tsunami Games (or Tsunami Media, Inc.) was an American video game developer and publisher founded in 1991 by former employees of Sierra Entertainment (then known as Sierra On-Line). The company was based in Oakhurst, California, which at the time was also the home of Sierra. Between 1992 and 1996 Tsunami published several games, most notably adventure games and interactive movies, before becoming defunct.

History 
Tsunami Games was formed in 1991 by Edmond Heinbockel, former chief financial officer of Sierra On-Line. Its early games were point-and-click adventure games including Ringworld: Revenge of The Patriarch, which was based on the Ringworld novels by Larry Niven. Blue Force, a police procedural adventure game, was designed by Jim Walls, the former designer of the Police Quest series at Sierra. Also notable was Protostar: War on the Frontier (1993), a space exploration and adventure game in the style of Starflight.

Interactive movies 
Tsunami made three interactive movies. Flash Traffic: City of Angels (1994) and Silent Steel (1995) are full-motion video-based games in which the player watches video clips and is asked to choose one of three options approximately every 15 seconds. These choices generally affect the game's story. Silent Steel was reportedly honored  by PC Entertainment Magazine for "Best Use of Live-Action Footage" in a CD-ROM game.  The third "interactive movie" is Man Enough, a dating sim which includes ostensibly "sexy" live-action video sequences.

List of games 
Wacky Funsters! The Geekwad's Guide to Gaming (1992, re-released on CD in 1993)
The Geekwad: Games of The Galaxy (1992, re-released on CD in 1993)
Ringworld: Revenge of the Patriarch (1993)
Blue Force (1993)
Protostar: War on the Frontier (1993)
Man Enough (1993)
Return to Ringworld (1994)
Flash Traffic: City of Angels (1994)
Silent Steel (1995)
Free Enterprise (or Free Enterpri$e) (1996)

References

External links 
 Tsunami Media, Inc. at MobyGames
 Home of the Underdog's company profile on Tsunami Games.

Defunct video game companies of the United States
Video game companies established in 1991
Video game development companies
Video game publishers
1991 establishments in California